Amat-Mamu, fl. ca. 1750 BC, Sippar in ancient Babylonia,  was a scribe whose existence is known from the cuneiform tablets on which she wrote.

Amat-Mamu was a Naditu priestess and temple scribe in Sippar, in ancient Babylonia. We know she lived in the gagum, a walled cloister precinct inhabited exclusively by women, similar to a convent.

Her name is known through Naditu documents that show Amat-Mamu was one of eight scribes within Sippar's gagum. Her career spanned the reigns of three kings, Hammurabi (1792–1750 BC), Samsu-iluna (1749–1712 BC), and Abi-eshuh (1711–1684 BC).

References

Biographical Notes on the Naditu Women of Sippar Rivkah Harris, Journal of Cuneiform Studies, Vol. 16, No. 1 (1962), pp. 1–12   Accessed September 2007

Ancient priestesses
Babylonian women
18th-century BC women writers
18th-century BC clergy
18th-century BC writers
Ancient Near Eastern scribes
18th-century BC people
Sippar
Ancient Asian women writers